Vachell is a surname. Notable people with the surname include:

Ada Vachell (1866–1923), English disabilities advocate
Charles Vachell, (1783–1859), Welsh businessman and local politician
Eleanor Vachell (1879–1948), Welsh botanist
Horace Annesley Vachell (1861–1955), English writer
Oliver Vachell, MP
Thomas Vachell (disambiguation)
Tanfield Vachell (1602–1658), English member of parliament

English-language surnames